The 2017 Red Bull Air Race of Chiba was the third round of the 2017 season, the eleventh season of the Red Bull Air Race World Championship. The event was held in Chiba, Japan.

Overview 
On January 19, 2017, 8 cities hosting the 2017 season were announced, and following the 2015 season and the 2016 season, it was decided to hold for the third consecutive and the third time in Japan and Chiba prefecture.

Following Abu Dhabi of the first game and San Diego of the second game, Chiba of the third game is also a maritime race.

Glay will serve as the ambassador of this event.
Also, Glay also wrote the theme song "XYZ".

Schedule 
 2017
 January 19 – the schedule is announced.
 June 3 – First day of the convention. Qualifying day.
Opening 10: 00, Competition start 13:00, Competition end 16: 00
 June 4 – Day 2 of the tournament. Final day.
Opening 10: 00, Competition start 13:00, Competition end 16: 00

It will be carried out even in case of rain, but it will be canceled in the case of stormy weather. Also, we will not carry forward the tournament.

Master Class

Qualification

Round of 14

  Pilot received 2 seconds in climbing in the gate
  Pilot received 2 seconds in incorrect level flying

Round of 8

  Pilot received 2 seconds in incorrect level flying
  Pilot received 2 seconds in climbing in the gate
  DNF in exceeding maximum g

Final 4

  Pilot received 2 in incorrect level flying
  Pilot received 3 in penalties

Standings after the event

Gallery 
 Facility

 Sideact

 Airplane

References

External links

 Chiba｜Red Bull Air Race – Official Web Site 

|- style="text-align:center"
|width="35%"|Previous race:2017 Red Bull Air Race of San Diego
|width="30%"|Red Bull Air Race2017 season
|width="35%"|Next race:2017 Red Bull Air Race of Budapest
|- style="text-align:center"
|width="35%"|Previous race:2016 Red Bull Air Race of Chiba
|width="30%"|Red Bull Air Race of Chiba
|width="35%"|Next race:2018 Red Bull Air Race of Chiba
|- style="text-align:center"

Red Bull Air Race, Chiba
Chiba
Red Bull Air Race, Chiba